The Tayrona blenny (Emblemariopsis tayrona) is a species of chaenopsid blenny endemic to the Atlantic waters off of Santa Marta, Colombia.

References

tayrona
Fish of Colombia
Taxonomy articles created by Polbot